Vadasery is an area/village of Nagercoil city in Kanyakumari district, Tamil Nadu. It is also famous for its Christopher (mofussil) bus stand, one of the two bus termini in Nagercoil is located here. Long route (mofussil) buses to other districts in Tamil Nadu and parts of Kerala starts here. It is a thriving region of Nagercoil with large vegetable, fish and meat markets.

Cities and towns in Kanyakumari district
Kanyakumari